"With a Smile and a Song" is a popular song.

The music was written by Frank Churchill, the lyrics by Larry Morey. The song was published in 1937. Credit is also sometimes (e.g.) given to Leigh Harline.

The song was sung by Adriana Caselotti in the Walt Disney animated film Snow White and the Seven Dwarfs. It also featured in the stage adaption from the film.
{{external media|align=center|width=270px|audio1= You may hear "With a Smile and a Song" sung by Adriana Caselotti in 1937 [https://adp.library.ucsb.edu/index.php/matrix/detail/200027689/PBS-09849-With_a_smile_and_a_song 'Here on uscb.edu]|audio2= You may hear "With a Smile and a Song" performed by the Shep Fields' Rippling Rhythm Jazz 
Orchestra and John Serry Here on Archive.org}}
In  1937, Shep Fields collaborated with the jazz accordionist John Serry Sr. in a recording of the song for Bluebird Records. University of California Santa Barbara - Discography of American Historical Recordings - "With a Smile and a Song" played by the Shep Fields Orchestra & John Serry on uscb.edu

The song was recorded by Doris Day with a children's choir for her 1964 album of the same name, With a Smile and a Song. A spoof of the song was used in Shrek the Third.

Snow White (played by Ginnifer Goodwin) hums the song while sweeping the dwarfs' house in the episode "Heart of Darkness" of Once Upon a Time''.

References

Songs about music
1937 songs
Bluebird Records singles
Music published by Bourne Co. Music Publishers
Songs from Snow White and the Seven Dwarfs (1937 film)
Songs with lyrics by Larry Morey
Songs with music by Frank Churchill
Songs written for animated films